The Crossing of the Andes was one of the most important feats in the Argentine and Chilean wars of independence, in which a combined army of Argentine soldiers and Chilean exiles invaded Chile crossing the Andes range separating Argentina from Chile, leading to Chile's liberation from Spanish rule. 

Led by José de San Martín, and setting out from Mendoza – then part of the Province of Cuyo, Argentina – in January 1817, the successful crossing of the army took 21 days. Having to manage heights averaging 3,000 mts, the feat has been compared to Hannibal's or Napoleon's crossing of the Alps, and is regarded among the greatest of its kind in universal military history.

Background
The crossing of the Andes was a major step in the strategy devised by José de San Martín to defeat the royalist forces at their stronghold of Lima, Viceroyalty of Perú, and secure the Spanish American independence movements. The idea of crossing was already developed by secret lodges seeking the independence of South America, and was part of the Maitland Plan designed by Thomas Maitland. San Martín learned of it during his brief time in Britain, before sailing to South America. After becoming aware of the difficulty of attacking the royalist stronghold of Lima across Upper Peru, he decided to proceed with such a plan. 

The Captaincy General of Chile had removed their governor in 1810, and replaced him with the First Government Junta, starting a period of Chilean history known as Patria Vieja. However, they would be defeated in 1814 during the battle of Rancagua, and with the Reconquista Chile would become again a royalist stronghold. Bernardo O'Higgins and other Chilean leaders had fled to Mendoza during the new royalist government, which led to O'Higgins being part of the Army of the Andes as well as the Argentine soldiers.

Troops and equipment
The city of Mendoza, during this time frame, became a factoring headquarters during the pre-crossing. The citizens of Mendoza assisted their troops by manufacturing gunpowder and ammunition. They also learned to make cannons.

The main food of the army was a regional meal called valdiviano. It was prepared with dry meat or charqui, sliced raw onion, potatoes and boiling water. They had designated soldiers who carried the food. These soldiers transported forty tons of charqui; maize cakes; meat; brandy, to counter the nighttime cold; garlic and onion, to deal with the lack of appetite; more than 4,000 cattle for the rest of the campaign; plus cheese and rum.

Crossing

On the morning of January 19, 1817, San Martin and his army set out from their base camp El Plumerillo and began their journey across the Andes Mountain range. San Martin crossed with 4,000 men, only to end up losing 1/3 of them. 
The number of auxiliaries reached 1,200. 

For the crossing, San Martin split his army into two divisions: The main division, which traveled through the pass of Los Patos, was led by San Martin, Miguel Estanislao Soler and Bernardo O'Higgins. The secondary troop, which traveled through the more southern Uspallata, was led by Juan Gregorio de Las Heras.

Coming to an end

On February 13, 1817, San Martín, O’Higgins, and their army successfully entered Santiago, Chile, after crossing 500 kilometers of mountain range, and the journey came to an end. The royalist forces, by this time, had advanced north to avoid San Martín's army, but a royalist leader had stayed behind with 1,500 men to advance at a valley called Chacabuco, which was located near Santiago. Thus, the Battle of Chacabuco began.

Legacy
In 2010 the Argentine and Chilean armies recreated the crossing during the commemorations of the 200 years of Revolution.

See also
Chilean Independence
Argentina–Chile relations
Revolución: El cruce de los Andes

Notes

Further reading
 Harvey, Robert. "Liberators: Latin America`s Struggle For Independence, 1810–1830". John Murray, London (2000). 
 
 

 

Campaigns of the Argentine War of Independence
Chilean War of Independence
José de San Martín
Conflicts in 1817
1817 in the Captaincy General of Chile
1817 in Argentina
Invasions by Argentina
January 1817 events
February 1817 events
Principal Cordillera
Mountain warfare